The following species in the flowering plant genus Crotalaria, many of which are called rattlepods or rattleboxes, are recognised by Plants of the World Online: 

Crotalaria abbreviata 
Crotalaria abscondita 
Crotalaria acicularis 
Crotalaria aculeata 
Crotalaria adamii 
Crotalaria adamsonii 
Crotalaria adariensis 
Crotalaria adenocarpoides 
Crotalaria adolfi 
Crotalaria aegyptiaca 
Crotalaria afrocentralis 
Crotalaria agatiflora 
Crotalaria aiantha 
Crotalaria aidiostipulata 
Crotalaria alata 
Crotalaria albicaulis 
Crotalaria albida 
Crotalaria alemanniana 
Crotalaria alexandri 
Crotalaria allophylla 
Crotalaria alticola 
Crotalaria amoena 
Crotalaria andringitrensis 
Crotalaria andromedifolia 
Crotalaria androyensis 
Crotalaria angulata 
Crotalaria angulicaulis 
Crotalaria anisophylla 
Crotalaria ankaizinensis 
Crotalaria ankaratrana 
Crotalaria annamensis 
Crotalaria anningensis 
Crotalaria annua 
Crotalaria anomala 
Crotalaria anthyllopsis 
Crotalaria antunesii 
Crotalaria arcuata 
Crotalaria arenaria 
Crotalaria argenteotomentosa 
Crotalaria argyraea 
Crotalaria argyrolobioides 
Crotalaria aridicola 
Crotalaria arrecta 
Crotalaria arushae 
Crotalaria assadii 
Crotalaria assurgens 
Crotalaria atrorubens 
Crotalaria aurea 
Crotalaria avonensis 
Crotalaria awasensis 
Crotalaria axillaris 
Crotalaria axilliflora 
Crotalaria axillifloroides 
Crotalaria bahiaensis 
Crotalaria bakeriana 
Crotalaria balansae 
Crotalaria balbi 
Crotalaria ballyi 
Crotalaria bamendae 
Crotalaria barbata 
Crotalaria barkae 
Crotalaria barnabassii 
Crotalaria basipeta 
Crotalaria baumii 
Crotalaria becquetii 
Crotalaria beddomeana 
Crotalaria bemba 
Crotalaria benadirensis 
Crotalaria benguellensis 
Crotalaria bequaertii 
Crotalaria bernieri 
Crotalaria berteroana 
Crotalaria bhutanica 
Crotalaria bifaria 
Crotalaria blanda 
Crotalaria boehmii 
Crotalaria bogdaniana 
Crotalaria boliviensis 
Crotalaria bondii 
Crotalaria bongensis 
Crotalaria boranica 
Crotalaria bosseri 
Crotalaria boudetii 
Crotalaria boutiqueana 
Crotalaria brachycarpa 
Crotalaria bracteata 
Crotalaria bredoi 
Crotalaria brevicornuta 
Crotalaria brevidens 
Crotalaria breviflora 
Crotalaria brevipedunculata 
Crotalaria brevis 
Crotalaria bupleurifolia 
Crotalaria burhia 
Crotalaria burkeana 
Crotalaria burttii 
Crotalaria cabui 
Crotalaria cajanifolia 
Crotalaria callensii 
Crotalaria calliantha 
Crotalaria calva 
Crotalaria calycina 
Crotalaria cambodiensis 
Crotalaria campestris 
Crotalaria camptosepala 
Crotalaria candicans 
Crotalaria capensis 
Crotalaria capillipes 
Crotalaria capuronii 
Crotalaria carrissoana 
Crotalaria carsonii 
Crotalaria carsonioides 
Crotalaria caudata 
Crotalaria cephalotes 
Crotalaria chaco-serranensis 
Crotalaria chamaepeuce 
Crotalaria chinensis 
Crotalaria chirindae 
Crotalaria chondrocarpa 
Crotalaria chrysantha 
Crotalaria chrysochlora 
Crotalaria chrysotricha 
Crotalaria cistoides 
Crotalaria clarkei 
Crotalaria claussenii 
Crotalaria clavata 
Crotalaria cleomifolia 
Crotalaria cobalticola 
Crotalaria collina 
Crotalaria colorata 
Crotalaria comanestiana 
Crotalaria comosa 
Crotalaria concinna 
Crotalaria confertiflora 
Crotalaria confusa 
Crotalaria congesta 
Crotalaria congoensis 
Crotalaria cordata 
Crotalaria cornetii 
Crotalaria cornu-ammonis 
Crotalaria corymbosa 
Crotalaria coursii 
Crotalaria craspedocarpa 
Crotalaria crebra 
Crotalaria criniramea 
Crotalaria crispata 
Crotalaria cunninghamii 
Crotalaria cupricola 
Crotalaria cuspidata 
Crotalaria cyanea 
Crotalaria cyanoxantha 
Crotalaria cylindrica 
Crotalaria cylindrocarpa 
Crotalaria cylindrostachys 
Crotalaria cytisoides 
Crotalaria dalensis 
Crotalaria damarensis 
Crotalaria dasyclada 
Crotalaria debilis 
Crotalaria decaryana 
Crotalaria decora 
Crotalaria dedzana 
Crotalaria deflersii 
Crotalaria deightonii 
Crotalaria densicephala 
Crotalaria depressa 
Crotalaria desaegeri 
Crotalaria descampsii 
Crotalaria deserticola 
Crotalaria dewildemaniana 
Crotalaria digitata 
Crotalaria dilatata 
Crotalaria diminuta 
Crotalaria dinteri 
Crotalaria diosmifolia 
Crotalaria dissitiflora 
Crotalaria distans 
Crotalaria distantiflora 
Crotalaria doidgeae 
Crotalaria dolichantha 
Crotalaria dolichonyx 
Crotalaria doniana 
Crotalaria dubia 
Crotalaria duboisii 
Crotalaria dumosa 
Crotalaria dura 
Crotalaria durandiana 
Crotalaria duvigneaudii 
Crotalaria ebenoides 
Crotalaria edmundi-bakeri 
Crotalaria egregia 
Crotalaria elizabethae 
Crotalaria emarginata 
Crotalaria emarginella 
Crotalaria emirnensis 
Crotalaria ephemera 
Crotalaria epunctata 
Crotalaria eremaea 
Crotalaria eremicola 
Crotalaria ericoides 
Crotalaria eriocarpa 
Crotalaria erythrophleba 
Crotalaria eurycalyx 
Crotalaria evolvuloides 
Crotalaria exaltata 
Crotalaria excisa 
Crotalaria exelliana 
Crotalaria exilipes 
Crotalaria exilis 
Crotalaria eximia 
Crotalaria fallax 
Crotalaria fascicularis 
Crotalaria fenarolii 
Crotalaria fiherenensis 
Crotalaria filicaulis 
Crotalaria filifolia 
Crotalaria filiformis 
Crotalaria filipes 
Crotalaria flavicarinata 
Crotalaria flavicoma 
Crotalaria florida 
Crotalaria formosa 
Crotalaria friesii 
Crotalaria fysonii 
Crotalaria gamwelliae 
Crotalaria gazensis 
Crotalaria germainii 
Crotalaria giessii 
Crotalaria gillettii 
Crotalaria glabripedicellata 
Crotalaria glauca 
Crotalaria glaucifolia 
Crotalaria glaucoides 
Crotalaria globifera 
Crotalaria globosa 
Crotalaria gloriae 
Crotalaria gnidioides 
Crotalaria goetzei 
Crotalaria goiasensis 
Crotalaria goodiiformis 
Crotalaria goreensis 
Crotalaria gracilipes 
Crotalaria grahamiana 
Crotalaria graminicola 
Crotalaria grandibracteata 
Crotalaria grandiflora 
Crotalaria grandistipulata 
Crotalaria grata 
Crotalaria greenwayi 
Crotalaria grevei 
Crotalaria griquensis 
Crotalaria griseofusca 
Crotalaria hainanensis 
Crotalaria handelii 
Crotalaria harleyi 
Crotalaria haumaniana 
Crotalaria hebecarpa 
Crotalaria heidmannii 
Crotalaria hemsleyi 
Crotalaria herpetoclada 
Crotalaria heterotricha 
Crotalaria heyneana 
Crotalaria hilariana 
Crotalaria hirsuta 
Crotalaria hirta 
Crotalaria hoffmannii 
Crotalaria holoptera 
Crotalaria holosericea 
Crotalaria horrida 
Crotalaria huillensis 
Crotalaria humbertiana 
Crotalaria humbertii 
Crotalaria humifusa 
Crotalaria humilis 
Crotalaria hypargyrea 
Crotalaria hyssopifolia 
Crotalaria ibityensis 
Crotalaria impressa 
Crotalaria incana 
Crotalaria incompta 
Crotalaria incrassifolia 
Crotalaria inequalis 
Crotalaria inflexa 
Crotalaria inopinata 
Crotalaria insignis 
Crotalaria intonsa 
Crotalaria intricata 
Crotalaria involutifolia 
Crotalaria inyangensis 
Crotalaria ionoptera 
Crotalaria iringana 
Crotalaria irwinii 
Crotalaria isaloensis 
Crotalaria ivantulensis 
Crotalaria jacksonii 
Crotalaria jerokoensis 
Crotalaria jianfengensis 
Crotalaria jijigensis 
Crotalaria johannis 
Crotalaria johnstonii 
Crotalaria jubae 
Crotalaria juncea 
Crotalaria jurioniana 
Crotalaria kambanguensis 
Crotalaria kambolensis 
Crotalaria kanaii 
Crotalaria kanchiana 
Crotalaria kandoensis 
Crotalaria kapiriensis 
Crotalaria karagwensis 
Crotalaria kassneri 
Crotalaria kelaensis 
Crotalaria keniensis 
Crotalaria kerkvoordei 
Crotalaria khasiana 
Crotalaria kibaraensis 
Crotalaria kipandensis 
Crotalaria kipilaensis 
Crotalaria kirkii 
Crotalaria kodaiensis 
Crotalaria kolbergii 
Crotalaria kostermansii 
Crotalaria kuiririensis 
Crotalaria kundelunguensis 
Crotalaria kurtii 
Crotalaria kurzii 
Crotalaria kwengeensis 
Crotalaria laburnifolia 
Crotalaria laburnoides 
Crotalaria lachnocarpoides 
Crotalaria lachnophora 
Crotalaria lachnosema 
Crotalaria laeta 
Crotalaria laevigata 
Crotalaria lanceolata 
Crotalaria lancifoliolata 
Crotalaria larsenii 
Crotalaria lasiocarpa 
Crotalaria lathyroides 
Crotalaria lawalreeana 
Crotalaria laxiflora 
Crotalaria leandriana 
Crotalaria lebeckioides 
Crotalaria lebrunii 
Crotalaria ledermannii 
Crotalaria lejoloba 
Crotalaria leonardiana 
Crotalaria lepidissima 
Crotalaria leprieurii 
Crotalaria leptocarpa 
Crotalaria leptoclada 
Crotalaria leptostachya 
Crotalaria leschenaultii 
Crotalaria leubnitziana 
Crotalaria leucoclada 
Crotalaria lidiae 
Crotalaria limosa 
Crotalaria linearifoliolata 
Crotalaria linifolia 
Crotalaria lisowskii 
Crotalaria loandae 
Crotalaria longiclavata 
Crotalaria longidens 
Crotalaria longipes 
Crotalaria longirostrata 
Crotalaria longithyrsa 
Crotalaria lotifolia 
Crotalaria lotiformis 
Crotalaria lotoides 
Crotalaria lukafuensis 
Crotalaria lukomae 
Crotalaria lukwangulensis 
Crotalaria lundensis 
Crotalaria lunulata 
Crotalaria luondeensis 
Crotalaria lusamboensis 
Crotalaria lusingaensis 
Crotalaria lutescens 
Crotalaria luxenii 
Crotalaria luzoniensis 
Crotalaria macrantha 
Crotalaria macrocalyx 
Crotalaria macrocarpa 
Crotalaria madurensis 
Crotalaria magaliesbergensis 
Crotalaria mahafalensis 
Crotalaria mairei 
Crotalaria malaissei 
Crotalaria malindiensis 
Crotalaria mandrarensis 
Crotalaria manganifera 
Crotalaria manongarivensis 
Crotalaria martiana 
Crotalaria massaiensis 
Crotalaria mauensis 
Crotalaria maypurensis 
Crotalaria medicaginea 
Crotalaria meeboldii 
Crotalaria meghalayensis 
Crotalaria melanocalyx 
Crotalaria melanocarpa 
Crotalaria mendesii 
Crotalaria mendoncae 
Crotalaria mentiens 
Crotalaria mesopontica 
Crotalaria mexicana 
Crotalaria meyeriana 
Crotalaria micans 
Crotalaria micheliana 
Crotalaria micrantha 
Crotalaria microcarpa 
Crotalaria microphylla 
Crotalaria microthamnus 
Crotalaria mildbraedii 
Crotalaria milneana 
Crotalaria minutissima 
Crotalaria miottoae 
Crotalaria miranda 
Crotalaria misella 
Crotalaria mitchellii 
Crotalaria mocubensis 
Crotalaria modesta 
Crotalaria mollicula 
Crotalaria mollii 
Crotalaria monophylla 
Crotalaria montana 
Crotalaria monteiroi 
Crotalaria mortonii 
Crotalaria morumbensis 
Crotalaria mudugensis 
Crotalaria muenzneri 
Crotalaria multibracteata 
Crotalaria multiflora 
Crotalaria mwangulangoi 
Crotalaria mysorensis 
Crotalaria namuliensis 
Crotalaria nana 
Crotalaria naragutensis 
Crotalaria natalensis 
Crotalaria natalitia 
Crotalaria nayaritensis 
Crotalaria nematophylla 
Crotalaria neriifolia 
Crotalaria newtoniana 
Crotalaria nigricans 
Crotalaria nitens 
Crotalaria notonii 
Crotalaria novae-hollandiae 
Crotalaria nuda 
Crotalaria nudiflora 
Crotalaria nyikensis 
Crotalaria obscura 
Crotalaria obtecta 
Crotalaria occidentalis 
Crotalaria occulta 
Crotalaria ochroleuca 
Crotalaria oligosperma 
Crotalaria oligostachya 
Crotalaria onobrychis 
Crotalaria ononoides 
Crotalaria onusta 
Crotalaria oocarpa 
Crotalaria orientalis 
Crotalaria orixensis 
Crotalaria orthoclada 
Crotalaria otoptera 
Crotalaria ovata 
Crotalaria oxyphylla 
Crotalaria oxyphylloides 
Crotalaria pallida 
Crotalaria pallidicaulis 
Crotalaria paniculata 
Crotalaria paracistoides 
Crotalaria paraspartea 
Crotalaria parvula 
Crotalaria passerinoides 
Crotalaria patula 
Crotalaria paulina 
Crotalaria pearsonii 
Crotalaria peduncularis 
Crotalaria pellita 
Crotalaria peltieri 
Crotalaria pentaphylla 
Crotalaria perbracteolata 
Crotalaria peregrina 
Crotalaria perlaxa 
Crotalaria perpusilla 
Crotalaria perrieri 
Crotalaria perrottetii 
Crotalaria persica 
Crotalaria pervillei 
Crotalaria peschiana 
Crotalaria petiolata 
Crotalaria petitiana 
Crotalaria phillipsiae 
Crotalaria phylicoides 
Crotalaria phylloloba 
Crotalaria phyllostachya 
Crotalaria phyllostachys 
Crotalaria pilosa 
Crotalaria pilosiflora 
Crotalaria pisicarpa 
Crotalaria pittardiana 
Crotalaria platysepala 
Crotalaria pleiophylla 
Crotalaria plowdenii 
Crotalaria podocarpa 
Crotalaria poecilantha 
Crotalaria poissonii 
Crotalaria polhillii 
Crotalaria poliochlora 
Crotalaria polyantha 
Crotalaria polychroma 
Crotalaria polygaloides 
Crotalaria polyphylla 
Crotalaria polysperma 
Crotalaria polytricha 
Crotalaria praetexta 
Crotalaria preladoi 
Crotalaria priestleyoides 
Crotalaria prittwitzii 
Crotalaria prolongata 
Crotalaria prostrata 
Crotalaria protensa 
Crotalaria psammophila 
Crotalaria pseudoalexanderi 
Crotalaria pseudodiloloensis 
Crotalaria pseudoquangensis 
Crotalaria pseudoseretii 
Crotalaria pseudospartium 
Crotalaria pseudotenuirama 
Crotalaria pseudovirgultalis 
Crotalaria pterocalyx 
Crotalaria pteropoda 
Crotalaria pterospartioides 
Crotalaria pudica 
Crotalaria pulchra 
Crotalaria pumila 
Crotalaria purdieana 
Crotalaria purshii 
Crotalaria pusilla 
Crotalaria pycnostachya 
Crotalaria pygmaea 
Crotalaria quangensis 
Crotalaria quarrei 
Crotalaria quartiniana 
Crotalaria quercetorum 
Crotalaria quinquefolia 
Crotalaria reclinata 
Crotalaria recta 
Crotalaria recumbens 
Crotalaria renieriana 
Crotalaria reptans 
Crotalaria retusa 
Crotalaria rhizoclada 
Crotalaria rhodesiae 
Crotalaria rhynchocarpa 
Crotalaria rhynchotropioides 
Crotalaria rigida 
Crotalaria ringoetii 
Crotalaria riparia 
Crotalaria rogersii 
Crotalaria rosenii 
Crotalaria rotundifolia 
Crotalaria rubiginosa 
Crotalaria rufipila 
Crotalaria rufocaulis 
Crotalaria rupicola 
Crotalaria ruspoliana 
Crotalaria rzedowskii 
Crotalaria sacculata 
Crotalaria sagittalis 
Crotalaria saharae 
Crotalaria salicifolia 
Crotalaria saltiana 
Crotalaria sandoorensis 
Crotalaria sapinii 
Crotalaria scabra 
Crotalaria scabrella 
Crotalaria scassellatii 
Crotalaria schiedeana 
Crotalaria schinzii 
Crotalaria schlechteri 
Crotalaria schliebenii 
Crotalaria schmitzii 
Crotalaria schweinfurthii 
Crotalaria seemeniana 
Crotalaria semperflorens 
Crotalaria senegalensis 
Crotalaria sengensis 
Crotalaria serengetiana 
Crotalaria sericea 
Crotalaria sericifolia 
Crotalaria serpentinicola 
Crotalaria sertulifera 
Crotalaria sessiliflora 
Crotalaria sessilis 
Crotalaria shanica 
Crotalaria shevaroyensis 
Crotalaria shirensis 
Crotalaria shrirangiana 
Crotalaria shuklae 
Crotalaria similis 
Crotalaria simoma 
Crotalaria simulans 
Crotalaria singulifloroides 
Crotalaria smithiana 
Crotalaria socotrana 
Crotalaria somalensis 
Crotalaria sonorensis 
Crotalaria sparsifolia 
Crotalaria spartea 
Crotalaria spartioides 
Crotalaria spathulatofoliolata 
Crotalaria speciosa 
Crotalaria spectabilis 
Crotalaria sphaerocarpa 
Crotalaria spinosa 
Crotalaria squamigera 
Crotalaria staneriana 
Crotalaria stenopoda 
Crotalaria stenoptera 
Crotalaria stenorhampha 
Crotalaria stenothyrsa 
Crotalaria steudneri 
Crotalaria stipitata 
Crotalaria stipularia 
Crotalaria stocksii 
Crotalaria stolzii 
Crotalaria streptorrhyncha 
Crotalaria strigulosa 
Crotalaria stuhlmannii 
Crotalaria subcaespitosa 
Crotalaria subcalvata 
Crotalaria subcapitata 
Crotalaria subdecurrens 
Crotalaria subperfoliata 
Crotalaria subsessilis 
Crotalaria subspicata 
Crotalaria subtilis 
Crotalaria suffruticosa 
Crotalaria sulphizii 
Crotalaria sylvicola 
Crotalaria szaferiana 
Crotalaria tabularis 
Crotalaria tamboensis 
Crotalaria tanety 
Crotalaria tchibangensis 
Crotalaria teixeirae 
Crotalaria tenuipedicellata 
Crotalaria tenuirama 
Crotalaria tenuirostrata 
Crotalaria teretifolia 
Crotalaria tetragona 
Crotalaria tetraptera 
Crotalaria thaumasiophylla 
Crotalaria thebaica 
Crotalaria thomasii 
Crotalaria tiantaiensis 
Crotalaria toamasinae 
Crotalaria torrei 
Crotalaria trichotoma 
Crotalaria trifoliastrum 
Crotalaria trifoliolata 
Crotalaria trinervia 
Crotalaria triquetra 
Crotalaria tristis 
Crotalaria tsavoana 
Crotalaria tweedieana 
Crotalaria ubonensis 
Crotalaria uguenensis 
Crotalaria ukambensis 
Crotalaria ukingensis 
Crotalaria ulbrichiana 
Crotalaria uliginosa 
Crotalaria umbellifera 
Crotalaria uncinata 
Crotalaria uncinella 
Crotalaria unicaulis 
Crotalaria unifoliolata 
Crotalaria vagans 
Crotalaria valetonii 
Crotalaria valida 
Crotalaria vallicola 
Crotalaria vandenbrandii 
Crotalaria vanderystii 
Crotalaria vanmeelii 
Crotalaria varians 
Crotalaria varicosa 
Crotalaria variifolia 
Crotalaria vasculosa 
Crotalaria vatkeana 
Crotalaria velutina 
Crotalaria verdcourtii 
Crotalaria verrucosa 
Crotalaria vespertilio 
Crotalaria vestita 
Crotalaria vialattei 
Crotalaria vialis 
Crotalaria virgulata 
Crotalaria virgultalis 
Crotalaria vitellina 
Crotalaria walkeri 
Crotalaria warfae 
Crotalaria welwitschii 
Crotalaria wightiana 
Crotalaria wilczekiana 
Crotalaria willdenowiana 
Crotalaria xanthoclada 
Crotalaria yaihsienensis 
Crotalaria youngii 
Crotalaria yunnanensis

References

Crotalaria